Grambling's White Tiger (also released as White Tiger in Europe) is a 1981 TV movie about the true story of Jim Gregory (played by Caitlyn Jenner, credited as Bruce Jenner) the first white quarterback of the Grambling Tigers at Grambling College, a historically black college, in 1962. The movie covers Gregory's freshman year. Harry Belafonte stars as coach Eddie Robinson and LeVar Burton (already famous from Roots and later to be known for Reading Rainbow and Star Trek: The Next Generation) appears as Charles 'Tank' Smith, the first friend Jim Gregory makes on the team. The film is directed by Georg Stanford Brown.

Plot
The movie starts with the recruitment of Gregory as a talented recruit, keen to have the opportunity to go to a school with real NFL credentials, who also opens avenues for funding and recognition for the college. The story deals with issues of race, culture and integration at a critical time in America's history. It ends with grudging acceptance and a positive message — although Gregory only actually plays for less than a minute in the final game of the team's division winning season.

Outside the USA
The movie has enjoyed popularity outside the USA under different titles, usually some version of simply White Tiger. This is because Grambling would be unknown to other audiences and would not be understood in the title. It has been released in Finland under the names Team Tiger and White Tiger. It is particularly well known in Germany under the title Der Kampf der weißen Tiger (which translates as, The Struggle of The White Tiger). Movies featuring American Football have a very specific following in Germany.

All the releases are identical to the US release with various different covers for Video and DVD releases.

Production
Director: Georg Stanford Brown (also from Roots)

Writers: William A. Attaway; based on a book called My Little Brother's Coming Tomorrow by Bruce Bahrenburg

Cast
 Bruce Jenner as Jim Gregory
 Dennis Haysbert as James 'Shack' Harris
 Bill Overton as Slick
 Deborah Pratt as Jennifer
 Byron Stewart as Sandman
 Ray Vitte as Rags
 LeVar Burton as Charles 'Tank' Smith
 Harry Belafonte as Coach Eddie Robinson
 Vance Davis as Coach Porter
 Fred Pinkard as Dr. Ford
 Daniel Joseph Bernard as Gibbons
 Mark Chavis as Chris
 Betsy Corley as Coed Clerk
 Gilbert Culpepper as Holmes
 Rick Frederick as Male Clerk
 Marlene Leeper as Janey
 Alex Marshall as Wiley Coach
 Herb Nelson as Slob
 Glarence Odum as Potts
 Robert Parham as 'JJ' Johnson
 Anita Parrott as Mrs. Johnson
 John K. Price as Man at Counter
 Dorsey R. Richard as Rhino
 Katie Robinson as Waitress
 Tammy L. Staten as Ruby
 John Tellis as Guard
 Michael Jerome Williams as Pow Wow Samuels

Release
The film was released on DVD on June 3, 1998.

References

External links

Grambling State Tigers football
1981 films
American football films
American television films
Films directed by Georg Stanford Brown
1980s English-language films
1980s American films
NBC network original films
Films set in 1962
1981 television films